Jenny Tate (born 13 July 1960) is an Australian former swimmer. She competed in three events at the 1976 Summer Olympics.

References

External links
 

1960 births
Living people
Australian female swimmers
Olympic swimmers of Australia
Swimmers at the 1976 Summer Olympics
Place of birth missing (living people)